Brain Drain is a 2009 Spanish romantic-comedy film directed by Fernando González Molina and starring Mario Casas and Amaia Salamanca. The film is an A3 Films production.

The production started on 14 July 2008 in Madrid and Gijón, and its premier was on 24 April 2009. Due to great success in the Spanish's box offices, Carlos Theron filmed its sequel: Fuga de Cerebros: Ahora en Harvard (Brain Drain: Now in Harvard) in 2011.

Plot 
The film begins with an 18 year old Emilio (Mario Casas) who tells his amorous misadventures with Natalia (Amaia Salamanca) due to all his physical problems (orthodoncy, orthosis, etc.) When he is 18 he finally gets rid of all his dental appareils and has the chance to confess to Natalia his love. But when she gets a student grant to attend Oxford University (England), all his friends try to help him by going to Oxford too with fake grants.

However, once there, the group must confront several problems, such as their poor English and their disabilities and quirks (one of the Emilio's friends is blind, other is paraplegic and the last one is a drug dealer). Nevertheless, and despite their impediments, they make their best to help him to get closer to Natalia with disastrous results.

Cast 
Mario Casas as Emilio Carbajosa Benito
Amaia Salamanca as Natalia
Alberto Amarilla as José Manuel "Chuli" Sánchez Expósito
Gorka Lasaosa as Rafael "Ruedas" Garrido Calvo
Pablo Penedo as Felipe "Corneto" Roldán Salas
Canco Rodríguez as Raimundo "Cabra" Vargas Montoya
Blanca Suárez as "Angelical voice"/Speaker
Sarah Mühlhause as Claudia
Simon Cohen as Edward Chamberlain
Carlos Santos as Potro
Reg Wilson as Professor
Asunción Balaguer as Emilio's grandmother
Joan Dalmau as Emilio grandfather
Álex Angulo as Cecilio Garrido
Loles León as Rita Calvo
David Fernández Ortiz as Loren Sánchez
José Luis Gil as Manuel Roldán
Mariano Peña as Julián Roldán
Fernando Guillén as Natalia's grandfather
Antonio Resines as Natalia's father
Óscar Casas as Young Emilio Carbajosa Benito (11 years old)
Oliver Vigil as Young Emilio Carbajosa Benito (8 years old)
Andrea Diaz as Young Natalia

Reception 
In its first week at the Spanish theaters, the film reached €1.22 mill at the office box and nearly 200,000 spectators saw it. With those takings, Brain Drain was the first on the Spanish box and a hit forward to State of Play.

Meanwhile, in the international box office: in United States, the film got $1,614,121 in its first weekend at cinemas.

The total income amounted to almost €7 million, becoming the biggest blockbuster Spanish film in 2009.

The film itself, however, was panned by critics. On Letterboxd the movie has a 2-star rating.

See also 
 List of Spanish films of 2009

References

External links 
 

2009 films
2009 romantic comedy films
2000s buddy comedy films
2000s Spanish films
2000s Spanish-language films
Films directed by Fernando González Molina
Films set in the University of Oxford
Spanish romantic comedy films